Elektropartizany (Electropartisans, Electric Guerillas) is an anarcho-punk-rock-band from Saint Petersburg, Russia.

Kurilyov's anarchist point of view influences the band's ideology by punk social activism and nonconformist contemporary guerrilla-type art-riot against capitalism, statements and decadence of culture.

Members

  (vocal, guitar, bass)
  (drums)
 Dmitry Kovalev (guitar)
  (bass)
 Dmitry Drumov (bass)
 Sergey Letov (saxophone)

Discography

Studio albums

Compilations

Videography

 «Р.В.И Систему!» (DVD-single, 2013)

External links
 Official website 
 Elektropartizany on YouTube
 Elektropartizany on Facebook
 Elektropartizany on VK
 Elektropartizany on Twitter
 Elektropartizany on MySpace
 Elektropartizany on Google Play
 Elektropartizany on SoundCloud
 Elektropartizany on Kroogi
 Elektropartizany on Last.fm

Musical groups established in 2003
Musical groups from Saint Petersburg
Russian rock music groups